Aabdine (also spelled Abdeen) (Arabic: عبدين) is a village in the Bsharri District, North Governorate of Lebanon. The village is located near the towns of Billa, Lebanon and Tourza. In 2009, there were 870 voters in the town and there were 944 voters in the year 2014 with 474 females and 470 males. The town has one public and one private school, with approximately 151 students in the town.

References 

Populated places in the North Governorate
Bsharri District